The 1946 St. Norbert Green Knights football team was an American football team that represented St. Norbert College in De Pere, Wisconsin, as an independent during the 1946 college football season. In their first year under head coach Tom Hearden, the Green Knights compiled a perfect 8–0 record and outscored opponents by a total of 216 to 26, an average of 27.25 points scored on offense and 3.25 points allowed on defense.

Schedule

References

St. Norbert
St. Norbert Green Knights football seasons
College football undefeated seasons
St. Norbert Green Knightsfootball